The World Rally Championship (WRC) is a rallying series administrated by Fédération Internationale de l'Automobile (FIA), motorsport's world governing body. The series currently consists of 13 three-day events driven on surfaces that range from gravel and tarmac to snow and ice. Each rally is split into 15–25 special stages, which are run against the clock on closed roads. The WRC was formed from well-known and popular international rallies, most of which had previously been part of the European Rally Championship and/or the International Championship for Manufacturers; the series was first contested in 1973. The drivers' championship was first awarded in 1977 and 1978 as an FIA Cup for Drivers title, to Sandro Munari and Markku Alén, respectively. The first official world champion in rallying was Björn Waldegård in 1979.

Each season normally consists of 12 to 16 rallies driven on surfaces ranging from gravel and tarmac to snow and ice. Points from these events are calculated towards the drivers', co-drivers' and manufacturers' world championships. The driver's championship and manufacturer's championship are separate championships, but are based on the same point system. In the current points system, points are awarded at the end of each rally to the top ten WRC (overall) drivers that qualify as follows: 25, 18, 15, 12, 10, 8, 6, 4, 2, 1. In addition to those points, from 2011 each event holds 1 special stage, the Power Stage, in which drivers and co-drivers can score extra points – currently awarded to five fastest drivers (5, 4, 3, 2, 1). 

Sébastien Loeb holds the record for the most drivers' championships, winning nine during his career. He also holds the record for the most championships won in a row; he won his nine titles consecutively from 2004 to 2012. Sébastien Ogier is second with eight. Kalle Rovanperä is the youngest world champion; he was 22 years old when he won the 2022 World Rally Championship. French drivers have won the most titles with 18 championships between 3 drivers. Finland are second with 15 championships between 8 different drivers. Citroën cars have won the most drivers' championships with nine titles, all of them with Loeb.

Key

Winners

By season

By driver

By nationality

By manufacturer

Privateers counted as manufacturers.

Notes

References
General
 WRC.com WRC History
 FIA World Rally Championship FIA Results and Statistics
 eWRC-Results.com Top Stats

Specific

See also
List of World Rally Championship Co-Drivers' champions
List of World Rally Championship Manufacturers' champions
List of World Rally Championship records

External links
 World Rally Championship official site
 FIA official site

World Rally Championship Drivers' Champions
rally
Rally